Deryabkino is a rural locality (a selo) and the administrative center of Deryabkinskoye Rural Settlement, Anninsky District, Voronezh Oblast, Russia. The population was 575 as of 2010. There are 10 streets.

Geography 
Deryabkino is located 47 km east of Anna (the district's administrative centre) by road. Rostoshi is the nearest rural locality.

References 

Rural localities in Anninsky District